Valentin Le Du (born 15 July 1992), better known by his stage name Vald (sometimes stylized as VALD), is a French rapper.

Born in Aulnay-sous-Bois, in Seine-Saint-Denis, Île-de-France, he studied at Lycée privé catholique l'Espérance where he received a Baccalauréat S (Sciences). He then studied medicine for a semester before moving to Mathematics/Information, graduating with a licence. He also studied sound engineering.

He started rapping at age 17. He released a mixtape, NQNTMQMQMB (Ni Queue Ni Tête Mais Qui Met Quand Même Bien) in 2012, followed by another mixtape Cours de rattrapage the same year. Both were re-edited in 2016 as a double CD released through his website. On 27 October 2014, he released his debut EP NQNT (Ni Queue Ni Tête) with a music video, Bonjour, finding success. It was followed by the release of EP NQNT 2 on 25 September 2015. On 20 January 2017, he released his debut album Agartha on Mezoued Records & Suther Kane Films, and on Millenium, Capitol, Universal; the album earned a platinum certification in France. A leak of song material resulted in the release of the EP project NQNT 3. On 2 February 2018, Vald released his second album XEU featuring collaborations with rappers Sirius, Suik'on Blaz AD and Sofiane; the album received a double platinum certification. This was followed by the mixtape NQNT33 in September 2018. In October 2019, he released a third album, Ce monde est cruel (This world is cruel).

Personal life
Vald is of Breton descent through his father. In an interview with radio station Mouv', he stated he has a son, Charles, born in 2014.

Discography

Albums

EPs

Singles

Other charted songs

*Did not appear in the official Belgian Ultratop 50 charts, but rather in the bubbling under Ultratip charts.

Featured in

*Did not appear in the official Belgian Ultratop 50 charts, but rather in the bubbling under Ultratip charts.

References

External links
Official website

French rappers
French people of Breton descent
1992 births
Living people
Rappers from Seine-Saint-Denis